The 2011–12 Coastal Carolina Chanticleers men's basketball team represented Coastal Carolina University during the 2011–12 NCAA Division I men's basketball season. The Chanticleers, led by fifth year head coach Cliff Ellis, played their home games at Kimbel Arena and are members of the Big South Conference. They finished the season 19–12, 12–6 in Big South play to finish in second place. They lost in the quarterfinals of the Big South Basketball tournament to VMI. They were invited to the 2012 CollegeInsider.com Tournament where they lost in the first round to Old Dominion.

Roster

Schedule

|-
!colspan=9| Regular season

|-
!colspan=9| 2012 Big South Conference men's basketball tournament

|-
!colspan=9| 2012 CIT

References

Coastal Carolina Chanticleers men's basketball seasons
Coastal Carolina
Coastal Carolina